Ursa Astronomical Association is the largest astronomical association in Finland. Ursa was founded on 2 November 1921. Founding members include a renowned Finnish astronomer Yrjö Väisälä. In 1926 Ursa established the Ursa Observatory in Kaivopuisto district of Helsinki. In 2007 the Tähtikallio Observatory & Education Center was established in Artjärvi, its current equipment includes an Astrofox 36" Folded Newtonian Open tube telescope, an Alluna 16" Ritchey-Chrétien telescope, a Meade 16" LX200GPS Schmidt-Cassegrain telescope, a Sky-Watcher ED 120mm refractor telescope fitted with a Baader AstroSolar Solar Filter and a piggybacked Coronado SolarMax 40 H-Alpha telescope. Ursa's primary functions include advancing amateur astronomy and astronomical education. They have also published a magazine Tähdet ja avaruus since 1971. Anyone can join Ursa for an annual fee.

Sections
The organization has thirteen sections specialized in different aspects of amateur astronomy (and meteorology):
 Solar section
 Halo section
 Instrument section
 Atmospheric optical phenomena section
 Clubs and organization
 Lunar, planetary and cometary section
 Mathematics and information technology section
 Meteor section
 Storm chasing section
 Minor planet and occultation section
 Aurora section
 Deep sky section
 Satellite section

In addition, Ursa has two loosely organized hobby groups:

 Variable stars
 Observation conditions

See also
 List of astronomical societies

References

External links
 English section of Ursa website

Organizations established in 1921
Amateur astronomy organizations
Scientific organisations based in Finland